Susann Sundkvist (born 8 December 1957) is a Finnish athlete.  She competed in the women's high jump at the 1976 Summer Olympics.

Biography
Sundkvist has won six consecutive Finnish championships in the High jump at the senior level. Her record has been 1.87 m since 1976. Sundkvist has improved the Finnish record six times from 1974 to 1976 (from 1.75 to 1.87 m). At club level she represented Idrottsföreningen Drott and Kokkola Veikko of Pietarsaar. She reached silver in the European Athletics U20 Championships in 1975 in Athens with a measure of 1.86 m. She was coached by Göran Brunell.

Sundkvist is the youngest winner of the Finnish high jump championship. The 1973 championship reached 15 years, 8 months and 2 days. It is also the youngest medal (14 years, 8 months, 4 days).

She won 1976 Italian Athletics Indoor Championships, because in that year some non-Italian athletes were invited to participate in some competitions.

Achievements

References

External links
 

1957 births
Living people
Athletes (track and field) at the 1976 Summer Olympics
Finnish female high jumpers
Olympic athletes of Finland
People from Larsmo
Sportspeople from Ostrobothnia (region)